Mathias Andreas Bidstrup (25 March 1852 – 25 January 1929) was a Danish architect.

Biography
He was born in Rønne, Bornholm, the son of cobbler Jorgen Bernhard Bidstrup and Marie Hansine Sonne. 

Mathias Bidstrup  attended the Royal Danish Academy of Fine Arts for a single quarter in 1876. In 1876, he worked as a teacher at an art college with the architect Johan Daniel Herholdt. From 1876 to 1916 he was a partner in the construction firm  H.P. Bidstrups Byggeforretning. He was chairman of the Rønne Craft and Industry Association, a member of the Joint Representation of Danish Industry and Handicraft and chairman of the Bornholm Museum  Association. Bidstrup was the head of Rønne Technical School for 46 years (1881–1927). He was also a member of the City Council Rønne 1882–1888. 

As an architect, he had built a huge number of buildings on Bornholm, schools, churches (including Gudhjem Church), urban and rural stations, the post office in Rønne and many private houses.  Bidstrup was superintendent of Rønne Technical School for 46 years (1876–1915) and co-founder of Bornholm Museum  in 1893.

Personal life
On 17 April 1878 he married Cecilie Margrethe Bidstrup at the Sct. Nicolai Church in Rønne.
He was a  Knight of the Order of the Dannebrog.
His interests included the arts, history, archeology, engineering and geology. Two portraits of Bidstrup are found on the Bornholm island's Museum.
Bidstrup is buried at Rønne Kirkegård.

See also
List of Danish architects

References

External links
 Biography
 Bidstrup

1852 births
1929 deaths
People from Bornholm
Danish architects
Knights of the Order of the Dannebrog 
Royal Danish Academy of Fine Arts alumni